William Kitchen (7 December 1908 in Galgate, Lancashire, England – May 1994) was an international speedway rider who started his career with the Belle Vue Aces in 1933.

Career summary
Before he started speedway Kitchen was a prominent road trials rider and had taken part in the Isle of Man TT.

His pre-war career was with Belle Vue. In 1946 he became captain of the Wembley Lions and finished second in the British Speedway Championship. He finished fifth in the Speedway World Championship in 1938.

Kitchen was a member of a National League winning team eleven times in twenty years, a feat made even more exceptional given the fact that the outbreak of World War II cost his Belle Vue team the chance of earning Kitchen a twelfth title (the Aces were top of the league when it was abandoned), and the fact that the competition was suspended a further six seasons during the war.

Kitchen was also a regular England international with over forty appearances after the war as well as over thirty pre-war caps.

In 1950, Bill Kitchen won the Australian 3 Lap Championship at the Tracey's Speedway in Melbourne.

After retirement, Bill ran a motor spares shop bearing his own name, in Station Road Harrow until at least the 1980s.

World Final appearances
 1937 -  London, Wembley Stadium - 8th - 9pts + 7 semi-final points
 1938 -  London, Wembley Stadium - 5th - 9pts + 6 semi-final points
 1949 -  London, Wembley Stadium - 6th - 9pts

Players cigarette cards
Kitchen is listed as number 24 of 50 in the 1930s Player's cigarette card collection.

References 

1908 births
1994 deaths
British speedway riders
English motorcycle racers
Wembley Lions riders
Belle Vue Aces riders
Isle of Man TT riders